Blue Peter is a British children's television entertainment programme created by John Hunter Blair. It is the longest-running children's TV show in the world, having been broadcast since October 1958. It was broadcast primarily from BBC Television Centre in London until September 2011, when the programme moved to dock10 studios at MediaCityUK in Salford, Greater Manchester. It is currently shown live on the CBBC television channel on Fridays at 5pm. The show is also repeated on Saturdays at 11:30am, Sundays at 9:00am and a BSL version is shown on Tuesdays at 2:00pm.

Following its original creation, the programme was developed by a BBC team led by Biddy Baxter; she became the programme editor in 1965, relinquishing the role in 1988. Throughout the show's history there have been 41 presenters; currently, it is hosted by Mwaksy Mudenda, Joel Mawhinney and Abby Cook.

The show uses a nautical title and theme. Its content, which follows a magazine/entertainment format, features viewer and presenter challenges, competitions, celebrity interviews, popular culture, and sections on making arts and crafts items from household items. The show has had a garden in both London and Salford, known as the Blue Peter Garden, which is used during the summer and for outdoor activities. The programme has featured a number of pets including dogs, tortoises, cats, and parrots. The longevity of Blue Peter has established it as a significant part of British culture and British heritage.

Content

Blue Peter content is wide-ranging. Most programmes are broadcast live, but usually include at least one filmed report. There will also often be a demonstration of an activity in the studio, or a music or dance performance. Between the 1960s and 2011 the programme was made at BBC Television Centre, and often came from Studio 1, the fourth-largest TV studio in Britain and one of the largest in Europe. This enabled Blue Peter to include large-scale demonstrations and performances within the live programme. From the September 2007 series, the programme was broadcast from a small fixed set in Studio 2. However, from 2009 the series began to use the larger studios once more; also more programmes were broadcast in their entirety from the Blue Peter Garden. The show is also famous for its "makes", which are demonstrations of how to construct a useful object or prepare food. These have given rise to the oft-used phrase "Here's one I made earlier", as presenters bring out a perfect and completed version of the object they are making – a phrase credited to Christopher Trace, though Marguerite Patten is another possibility. Trace also used the line "And now for something completely different", which was later taken up by Monty Python. Time is also often given over to reading letters and showing pictures sent in by viewers.

Over 5,000 editions have been produced since 1958, and almost every episode from 1964 onwards still exists in the BBC archives. This is unusual for programmes of that era. Editor Biddy Baxter personally ensured that telerecordings and, from 1970, video recording were kept of each episode. The earliest surviving footage, a 35mm film sequence, comes from Programme 204 produced and broadcast in 1962. The earliest edition to survive in a complete form is Programme 238 from 1963, which survives as a 16mm film recording.

Many items from Blue Peter history have become embedded in British popular culture, especially moments when things have gone wrong, such as the much-repeated clip of Lulu the baby elephant (from a 1969 edition) who urinated and defecated on the studio floor, appeared to tread on the foot of presenter John Noakes and then proceeded to attempt an exit, dragging her keeper along behind her. Although it is often assumed to have been broadcast live, the edition featuring Lulu was one of the rare occasions when the programme was pre-recorded, as the presenters were en route to Ceylon for the summer expedition at the time of transmission. Other well-remembered and much-repeated items from this era include the Girl Guides' campfire that got out of hand on the 1970 Christmas edition, John Noakes's report on the cleaning of Nelson's Column, and Simon Groom referring to a previous item on the production of a facsimile door knocker for Durham Cathedral which was displayed alongside the original, with the words 'what a beautiful pair of knockers'.

History

Early years
Blue Peter was first aired on 16 October 1958. It had been commissioned to producer John Hunter Blair by Owen Reed, the head of children's programmes at the BBC, as there were no programmes for children aged between five and eight. Reed got his inspiration after watching Children's Television Club, the brainchild of former radio producer, Trevor Hill, who created the latter show as a successor to his programme Out of School, broadcast on BBC Radio's Children's Hour; Hill networked the programme from BBC Manchester and launched it aboard the MV Royal Iris ferry on the River Mersey, Liverpool with presenter Judith Chalmers welcoming everyone aboard at the bottom of the gangplank.

It was subsequently televised about once a month.  Hill relates how Reed came to stay with him and his wife, Margaret Potter, in Cheshire, and was so taken with the "Blue Peter" flag on the side of the ship and the programme in general, that he asked to rename it and take it to London to be broadcast on a weekly basis (see Reed's obituary). The "Blue Peter" is used as a maritime signal, indicating that the vessel flying it is about to leave, and Reed chose the name to represent 'a voyage of adventure' on which the programme would set out. Hunter Blair also pointed out that blue was a popular colour with children, and Peter was a common name of a typical child's friend.

The first two presenters were Christopher Trace, an actor, and Leila Williams, winner of Miss Great Britain in 1957. The two presenters were responsible for activities which matched the traditional gender roles. As broadcasting historian Asa Briggs expressed it in 1995: "Leila played with dolls; Chris played with trains". They were supported on occasion by Tony Hart, an artist who later designed the ship logo, who told stories about an elephant called Packi (or Packie). It was broadcast every Thursday for fifteen minutes (17.00–17.15) on BBC TV (which later became BBC One). Over the first few months more features were added, including competitions, documentaries, cartoons, and stories. Early programmes were almost entirely studio-based, with very few filmed inserts being made.

1960–1969
From Monday 10 October 1960, Blue Peter was switched to every Monday and extended from 15 minutes to 20 minutes (17.00–17.20). In 1961, Hunter Blair became ill, and was often absent. After he produced his last edition on 12 June 1961, a series of temporary producers took up the post. Hunter Blair was replaced the following September by Clive Parkhurst who did not get along with Leila Williams. "He could not find anything for me to do," Williams recalled. In October, she did not appear for six editions, and was eventually fired, leaving Christopher Trace on his own or with one-off presenters. Parkhurst was replaced by John Furness, and Anita West joined Trace on 7 May 1962. She featured in just 16 editions, making her the shortest-serving presenter, and was replaced by Valerie Singleton, who presented regularly until 1972, and on special assignments until 1981. Following the departure of Furness, a new producer who was committed to Blue Peter was required, so Biddy Baxter was appointed. At the time she was contracted to schools' programmes on the radio, and therefore unable to take up her new post immediately.

It was suggested that Edward Barnes, a production assistant, would temporarily produce the show until Baxter arrived, at which point he would become her assistant. This suggestion was turned down, and Leonard Chase, was appointed, with Barnes as his assistant. Baxter eventually joined Blue Peter at the end of October 1962.

During this period, many iconic features of Blue Peter were introduced. The first appeal took place in December 1962, replacing the practice of reviewing toys that children would ask for themselves. Blue Peters first pet, a brown and white mongrel dog named Petra, was introduced on 17 December 1962. The puppy soon died of distemper, and having decided against upsetting young viewers over the news, Barnes and Baxter had to search London pet shops for a convincing clandestine replacement. Features such as "makes" (normally involving creating something such as an advent crown, out of household junk) and cooking became regular instalments on Blue Peter and continue to be used today. The Blue Peter badge was introduced in 1963, along with the programme's new logo designed by Tony Hart. Baxter introduced a system that ensured replies sent to viewers' letters were personal; as a girl, she had written to Enid Blyton and twice received a standard reply, which had upset her.

The next year, from 28 September 1964, Blue Peter began to be broadcast twice weekly, with Baxter becoming the editor in 1965, and Barnes and Rosemary Gill (an assistant producer who had joined as a temporary producer while Baxter was doing jury service) becoming the programme's producers. The first Blue Peter book, an annual in all but name, was published that year, and one was produced nearly every year after that, until 2010. A third presenter, John Noakes, was introduced at the end of 1965 and became the longest-serving presenter. A complete contrast to Trace, Noakes set the scene for "daredevil" presenters that has continued through the generations of presenters. Trace left Blue Peter in July 1967, and was replaced by Peter Purves in November. The trio of Valerie Singleton, John Noakes and Peter Purves lasted five years, and according to Richard Marson were 'the most famous presenting team in the show's history'. In 1965, the first Summer Expedition (a filming trip abroad) was held in Norway, and continued every year (except 1986 and 2011) until 2012, all over the world.

1970–1999
The first colour edition of Blue Peter aired on 14 September 1970, and the last black and white edition on 24 June 1974. A regular feature of the 1970s were the Special Assignments, which were essentially reports on interesting topics, filmed on location. Singleton took this role, and in effect became the programme's "roving reporter". Blue Peter also offered breaking news on occasion, such as the 1971 eruption of Mount Etna, as well as unique items such as the first appearance of Uri Geller on British television. In May 1976, presenter Lesley Judd interviewed Otto Frank, father of Anne Frank, after he had agreed to bring his daughter's diaries to Britain. From 1971 the summer expedition from the previous year was edited into special programmes broadcast under the title Blue Peter Flies The World, televised during the summer break when the team were recording the latest expedition. The first was shown in July 1971 and featured the expedition to Jamaica.

In 1974, the Blue Peter Garden was officially opened in a green space outside the Television Centre restaurant block. By this time, Blue Peter had become an established children's programme, with regular features which have since become traditions. In 1978, the show celebrated its twentieth anniversary with a nationwide balloon launch from five regional cities during a special edition of the programme when Christopher Trace, Leila Williams, Valerie Singleton and Peter Purves returned. John Noakes contributed a message pre-recorded on film. At this time, Trace introduced the Blue Peter Outstanding Endeavour Award. Its theme music was updated by Mike Oldfield in 1979, and at the end of the decade a new presenting team was brought in, consisting of Simon Groom, Tina Heath and Christopher Wenner. They were overshadowed by the success of the previous two decades, and failed to make as much of an impact. Heath decided to leave after a year when she discovered she was pregnant, but agreed to have a live scan of her baby, something which had never been done on television before. Blue Peter was praised for this by the National Childbirth Trust who told the BBC that in 'five minutes, Blue Peter had done more to educate children about birth than they'd achieved in ten years of sending out leaflets'. The production team decided not to renew Wenner's contract, resulting in him leaving along with Heath on 23 June 1980.

Sarah Greene and Peter Duncan both joined in 1980, and a new producer, Lewis Bronze, joined in 1982. Janet Ellis joined Sarah Greene and Peter Duncan on 28 April 1983. The 1980s saw the Blue Peter studio become more colourful and bright, with the presenters gradually wearing more fashionable outfits, in contrast to the more formal appearance of previous decades. Several videos of Blue Peter were made available from 1982, the first being Blue Peter Makes, and an omnibus comprising the two weekly editions appeared in 1986 on Sunday mornings. Ahead of the show's 25th anniversary in October 1983, BBC1 ran a series Blue Peter Goes Silver, revisiting previous summer expeditions. The 25th anniversary itself was commemorated by a documentary presented by Valerie Singleton shown on BBC1 on Sunday, 16 October 1983. This was followed the next day by a special edition of the programme when Christopher Trace presented the annual Outstanding Endeavour Award and Valerie Singleton, Peter Purves, Christopher Wenner, Tina Heath and Sarah Greene returned to celebrate the show's birthday with the current presenting trio of Simon Groom, Peter Duncan and Janet Ellis who launched a national balloon treasure hunt. 
On 27 June 1988, Baxter took part in her final show, after nearly 26 years of involvement, and Bronze took her place as editor. Around this time, Blue Peter became distinctively environmentally aware, and introduced a green badge in November 1988 for achievements related to the environment. Shortly before, in October 1988, the show celebrated its thirtieth anniversary with a competition to design the cover of a commemorative issue of the 'Radio Times' and Valerie Singleton presented the Outstanding Endeavour Award on the birthday show itself. The following year, the award was presented for the last time.

On 13 September 1984, champion trampolinist and professional performer Michael Sundin presented for the first time, as a replacement for Peter Duncan. He had been talent spotted by the Blue Peter team when they filmed an item on the set of Return to Oz; Sundin was playing the part of Tik-Tok. After 77 appearances as a Blue Peter presenter his contract was not renewed. It has since been explained by Biddy Baxter that he attracted complaints from viewers. She stated in her autobiography that homophobia was not the reason for his departure: "he came across as a whinger.... and an effeminate whinger to boot... it was nothing to do with his sexual proclivities". Sundin successfully continued his performing career but died from an AIDS-related illness in 1989.

In 1989 (and again in 1992 and 1994), new arrangements of the theme tune were introduced. Due to falling ratings in BBC children's programming, BBC1 controller Alan Yentob suggested airing a third edition of Blue Peter each week from 1995. This meant that it was sometimes pre-recorded; Joe Godwin, the director, suggested that the Friday edition should be a lighter version of the show, which would concentrate on music, celebrities and games. Helen Lederer presented a documentary on BBC2 to celebrate the show's 35th anniversary Here's One I Made Earlier, with a special edition of the regular programme featuring the returns of Leila Williams, John Noakes and Lesley Judd amongst many other presenters. Neither Noakes or Judd had appeared in the studio since leaving the programme and Williams was returning for the first time in 15 years. A fourth presenter, Katy Hill, was introduced in 1995, but unlike earlier decades, there was little stability in the line-up, with resignations and new additions made almost every year of the decade. The 1990s also saw many more live broadcasts on location, with many shot entirely away from the studio. Blue Peter was also one of the first television series to launch a website. Oliver Macfarlane replaced Bronze as editor in 1996.

The 40th anniversary of the show was marked in 1998. Apart from two summer proms concerts, the most talked about event to celebrate the milestone was a trip behind LNER Peppercorn Class A2 60532 Blue Peter on an Edinburgh to London railtour. The special train in question was Days Out Limited's "Heart of Midlothian" from London Kings Cross to Edinburgh Waverley on Sun 19 April 1998, with 60532 working the train from Edinburgh. Due to safety rules, none of the presenters were supposed to ride on board the footplate during the trip. Peter Kirk, who was in charge on board the train and who was presenting from the footplate, however, allowed Stuart Miles to travel on board the footplate between Newark-on-Trent and Peterborough. This was the stretch of track which, on 3 July 1938, saw the world speed record for steam locomotives of  set by LNER A4 Locomotive no. 4468 Mallard (a segment in the same episode showed Katy Hill exploring the National Railway Museum and viewing locomotives like Mallard, Stephenson's Rocket, Midland Compound no'1000, LMS Black 5 no'5000 & 92220 Evening Star alongside Stuart helping with the servicing of 60532 in the NRM's yard).

In October 1998, Richard Bacon was sacked, following reports in News of the World that he had taken cocaine. This incident followed shortly after the show's 40th anniversary, when previous presenters returned for a special programme. Those returning included Leila Williams, Valerie Singleton, John Noakes, Peter Purves, Diane Louise Jordan, Anthea Turner, John Leslie, Tim Vincent, Yvette Fielding, Caron Keating, Mark Curry, Janet Ellis, Peter Duncan, Sarah Greene, Tina Heath, Simon Groom and Christopher Wenner. Steve Hocking then replaced Macfarlane as editor, at what was regarded as a difficult period for the programme. He introduced a further re-arrangement of the theme tune and a new graphics package in September 1999.

2000–2010
The 2000s began with the opening of two previously buried time capsules. Former presenters including Singleton, Purves and Noakes were invited back to assist, and the programme also looked at life in the 1970s when the first capsule was buried. With Hill's departure and replacement by Liz Barker in 2000, the new team of herself, Konnie Huq, Simon Thomas, and Matt Baker were consistent for the next few years. The Friday edition, as in the previous decade, featured games, competitions and celebrities, but additionally there was a drama series, The Quest, which featured cameos of many former presenters.

It was at this time that the new Head of the BBC Children's Department, Nigel Pickard, asked for Blue Peter to be broadcast all year round. This was achieved by having two editions per week instead of three during the summer months, and using pre-recorded material. The early 2000s also introduced Christmas productions, in which the presenters took part. In 2003, Richard Marson became the new editor, and his first tasks included changing the output of Blue Peter on the digital CBBC. The first year of the channel's launch consisted of repeated editions, plus spin-off series Blue Peter Unleashed and Blue Peter Flies the World. This new arrangement involved a complex schedule of live programmes and pre-recorded material, being broadcast on BBC One and CBBC. Marson also introduced a brand new set, graphics and music.

In September 2007, a new editor, Tim Levell, took over.  At the same time, budget cuts meant that the programme came from a smaller studio. In February 2008 the BBC One programme was moved from 5 pm to 4.35 pm to accommodate The Weakest Link, and as a result, Blue Peters ratings initially dropped to as low as 100,000 viewers in the age 6–12 bracket, before steadily improving.

As with the previous decade, numerous presenters joined and left the programme. This included the exits of Thomas, Baker and Barker and the additions of Zöe Salmon, Gethin Jones and Andy Akinwolere. Early 2008 saw the departure of Huq, who had become the longest serving female presenter with over ten years on the show. Later that year, Salmon and Jones both left and the presenting team of Akinwolere with new additions Helen Skelton and Joel Defries was introduced.

On 16 October 2008, Blue Peter celebrated the 50th Anniversary with a reception at Buckingham Palace hosted by Queen Elizabeth II and featuring several former presenters. There was a special live edition of the show broadcast to celebrate the anniversary with many returning presenters and a 60-minute documentary on BBC1 featuring interviews with many previous presenters and production staff, including Edward Barnes, Biddy Baxter and Rosemary Gill.

Writing in the BBC's in-house magazine, Ariel, in 2009, BBC Children's Controller Richard Deverell announced plans to re-invent the show to be more like the BBC's motoring programme Top Gear. Deverell hopes that by adding "danger and excitement", Blue Peter will achieve the same "playground buzz" among children as Top Gear.

2011–2017
In January 2011, Barney Harwood was introduced to the programme as replacement for Defries, who had departed in late 2010 after two years. Unusually, Harwood was no stranger to Blue Peter viewers, having appeared as a presenter on CBBC for many years, on shows including Prank Patrol and Bear Behaving Badly.

On 29 March 2011, Blue Peter became the first programme in the UK to broadcast an entire show in 360 degrees on the web. Viewers were able to watch the programme via their TVs and simultaneously interact with the television studio in front of and behind the cameras on the website. Viewers were also challenged to play a game where they had to find particular crew members and staff dressed up in distinctive costumes.

The final edition of Blue Peter to broadcast from the BBC's Television Centre in London was broadcast on 28 June 2011, before a move to the BBC's new facilities at Dock10, MediaCityUK. The set left behind at BBC Television Centre was subsequently purchased and installed at Sunderland University's David Puttnam Media Centre in August 2013.

When the new series started on 26 September 2011, after the usual summer break, Harwood and Skelton revealed the new look Blue Peter studio along with the new music and title sequence. Departed presenter Andy Akinwolere was not initially replaced, and for the first time in 50 years only two presenters remained on the programme. The new Blue Peter Garden, located outside the studios, was officially opened by Princess Anne in February 2012.

From 12 January 2012, Blue Peter has been broadcast all year round (with no break for summer) once a week, its original premiere being on CBBC on Thursdays at 5.45pm, changed to 5.30pm from April 2013 then 5:00 pm from March 2015. It was usually repeated on Fridays on BBC One, although this ceased in December 2012. A repeat airs at 9.00am on Sundays. At this time, Levell left to work at BBC Radio 5 Live; he was replaced (initially in an acting capacity) as editor by Ewan Vinnicombe, who had worked on the programme as a producer since 2007.  The reformatted Blue Peter occasionally also included specials and spin-offs such as "Helen's Polar Adventure" or the Stargazing Live special on other days of the week.

In 2013, Lindsey Russell was voted the 36th presenter via Blue Peter - You Decide!, a series of five programmes hosted by Dick and Dom, where ten aspiring presenters were set a number of challenges to prove that they were worthy of the position. Judges Cel Spellman, Eamonn Holmes and Myleene Klass decided the final three, before viewers were given the chance to vote online. Russell joined Blue Peter in September of that year, shortly before Skelton's departure and the introduction of her replacement Radzi Chinyanganya.

From October 2013, the team consisted of Harwood, Russell and Chinyanganya. The format adapted with slightly different branding and a more classic take on the show, as well as beginning Blue Peter Bites, which are five-minute clips showing just one challenge or video from episodes broadcast on CBBC. Blue Peter guide pup Iggy joined the team in 2014 and Shelley the Tortoise continues to make occasional appearances. The Blue Peter Garden is currently maintained by child gardener George who appears throughout the year. The team made more use of the website with more quizzes and videos such as 'Blue Peter VS...' and 'Ultimate Challenges' as well as holding a fan club hour after the show where fans could leave comments as to the answers of riddles or headline suggestions and ask guests questions. A popular game on the programme, Spot Shelley was also introduced, where, in most episodes, an animated version of Shelley the tortoise is hiding somewhere/on something and viewers must leave a comment on the website during the show, the first person to spot her wins a shout-out (or some more expensive or weird prizes as Harwood would often joke, such as a house in Spain or a unicorn called Eric). From April 2017, the show reverted to 5:30 pm. In September 2017, Harwood left the show, again leaving just two presenters.

In the summer, Blue Peter often challenges its viewers to earn all of their Blue Peter badges (with the exception of orange and gold) through five weeks, where the team look at each individual badge for a week, finishing with the limited time Sports badge which appears every summer with a different design. In the show before these weeks, the team show viewers how to make something to keep their badges in/on and continue the theme through the weeks, these have included the Badge Baton Relay in 2016, where badges stored within a baton tube and 
the Big Badge Boat Bonanza in 2017, where badges displayed on the iconic BP ship, a 2D model that can be made from paper.

Ahead of their Jubilee celebrations, Blue Peter introduced its first ever Guest Editor to the show on 19 October 2017 which was children's author Dame Jacqueline Wilson. Guest Editors have control for the day and plan what they what to show on their edition, as well as taking control behind the scenes.

2018–2021
A special programme broadcast on 1 February 2018, marked Blue Peters 5000th edition. A brand new Diamond badge was revealed for the first time, designed by Henry Holland. This was only to be awarded within the special 60th year of 2018.

On 12 October 2017, it was revealed that outside of MediaCityUK, a Hollywood style walk of fame would be created with the names of famous people who have received a Gold Blue Peter badge. The walkway would lead up to the front of the studios and would help to mark 60 years of Blue Peter.

There were various celebrations across the UK for "The Big Birthday Year". In January, a competition was launched to design Blue Peters second birthday balloon to be flown. In May, the Millennium Time Capsule formally buried under the Millennium Dome, which was dug up accidentally in 2017 by builders went on tour with various past presenters around the country. A play, "Once Seen On Blue Peter", ran at the Edinburgh Festival fringe in August, with six former presenters appearing in it.

On 16 October 2018, a special one-hour live edition of the programme, entitled Blue Peter: Big 60th Birthday, was broadcast on CBBC. Guests included The Vamps, Sophie Ellis-Bextor and Ed Sheeran, who was presented with a gold Blue Peter badge. Former presenters returned for the show and contributed to the broadcast, including Leila Williams, Anita West, Valerie Singleton, Peter Purves, Lesley Judd, Sarah Greene, Peter Duncan, Janet Ellis, Yvette Fielding, John Leslie, Diane-Louise Jordan, Anthea Turner, Tim Vincent, Stuart Miles, Katy Hill, Romana D'Annunzio, Richard Bacon, Konnie Huq, Simon Thomas, Liz Barker, Zöe Salmon, Andy Akinwolere, Helen Skelton, Joel Defries and Barney Harwood. Matt Baker contributed a pre-recorded message and Mark Curry was represented by a lego model as he had to cancel his contribution due to ill health. The programme was repeated on BBC Two on 20 October. The celebration was also marked by other BBC programming, including The One Show hosted by Matt Baker and former Blue Peter contributor Gabby Logan, which featured Sarah Greene, Mark Curry, Simon Thomas and Konnie Huq; ITV's Lorraine, where Greene appeared with Leila Williams and Anthea Turner; and BBC Breakfast which featured Lesley Judd. A documentary entitled Happy Birthday Blue Peter was broadcast that evening on BBC Radio 2. It was hosted by Barney Harwood and featured interviews with past and present presenters, as well as members of the production team. As part of the birthday celebrations, a new plant species was named "Blue Peter". In February 2019 a gritter was named and decorated "Blue Peter", unveiled by Russell.

2021–present
On 3 June 2021, the show received a refresh with a new logo, title sequence, music and studio. This was the first major refresh since the show's move to Salford in 2011. The studio is environmentally-friendly and is composed of upcycled materials from past studios.

On 24 June 2021, Russell announced that she would be leaving the show, after eight years. Her final show aired on 15 July 2021. 

On 17 June 2022, Adam Beales announced that he would be leaving the show, in July 2022, after 2 years. His final show aired on 15 July 2022. He announced on You Tube that he was Gay the next week on July 22nd 2022. 

On 22 October 2022, former presenter Skelton danced a Charleston with professional partner Gorka Marquez on Strictly Come Dancing to the Blue Peter theme tune as a part of the celebrations of BBC's 100th Anniversary. 

On 25 October 2022, Joel Mawhinney was announced as the latest presenter. Joel, 25, is a magician and content creator who first appeared in 2018 as a guest. He is best known for his illusions on social media where he has a huge following, with over 16.5 million on one platform alone. He also starred in his own BBC Northern Ireland TV series Life is Magic in 2020. He comes from the seaside town of Bangor, Co. Down in Northern Ireland, Zoe Salmon is from the same town. Joel is the 41st Blue Peter presenter and will co-host alongside Richie, Mwaksy and Henry the dog, with his first live show airing on 11 November.

On 3 February 2023, Driss announced that after 4 years he would leave the show, His last show aired on 3 March.

On 6 March 2023 a new presenter was announced; Abby Cook. Her first show aired on 10 March. Abby is a wheelchair user who has worked with Valley Disability Sport and as a mental health project administrator for Scottish Disability Sport. She also trains twice a week with Paralympians as part of the Forth Valley Flyers.

Presenters and contributors

Christopher Trace and Leila Williams were the first presenters of Blue Peter in October 1958, and since then, there have been 39 subsequent presenters. Mwaksy Mudenda, who was revealed as the 39th presenter in May 2020, currently presents the programme alongside Joel Mawhinney, who joined as the show's 41st presenter in November 2022.

Other personnel who have played roles on the show include the zoologist George Cansdale, who was the programme's first on-screen veterinarian, and Percy Thrower who was the show's gardening expert from 21 March 1974 to 23 November 1987 and was presented with a Gold Blue Peter badge shortly before he died in 1988. He was followed from 1988 until 1991 by Chris Crowder and from 1991 until 2000 by Clare Bradley. From 2004 until 2013 by Chris Collins. From 2014 to present, The Skinny Jean Gardeners Lee & Dale Connelly and child gardener George Hassal the RHS Ambassador, who makes various appearances throughout the year.

Another contributor, though rarely seen on screen, was Margaret Parnell, who created almost all of the show's "makes" from 1963 until her retirement in 2001. Her role was then filled by Gillian Shearing, though Parnell's name still appeared in the credits from time to time when a classic "make" was re-used.

Director/producer Alex Leger who joined the show in 1975 as a production assistant and retired in 2011, making him Blue Peters longest serving staff member ever. Presenter Anthea Turner said of Leger: "Alex was the director we feared and loved in the same sentence; he would push you to your limits of endurance and in my case made me face my fear of water by taking me to Crystal Palace to shoot a film about high board diving. Never have my knees knocked so much." Writing on The Huffington Post in November 2012, Leger admitted the "piles of clippings, strange souvenirs from overseas trips, half-finished 'makes' from the show and half-dead pot plants disguised the fact something ground-breaking was happening in the cramped Blue Peter offices". Leger published his book, Blue Peter: Behind the Badge, on 5 November 2012, in collaboration with many of his former colleagues.

The 40th presenter joined the team in September 2020, Adam Beales.  Beales left on 15 July 2022 after less than two years.

The most recent presenter to depart was Driss on 3 March 2023 after nearly 4 years.

Pets

The Blue Peter pets are the animals who regularly appear on the programme. These include dogs, cats, parrots and tortoises. John Noakes was almost famous for his work with a dog called Shep. Among the most recent Blue Peter pets are two cats, one called Socks and one called Cookie; and one tortoise called Shelley. Dog Mabel retired on 30 March 2010 after 14 years on the show. Barney, a red setter-dachshund, made his TV debut on Tuesday 22 September 2009, and left four years later at the same time as his owner, presenter Helen Skelton. Lucy, a golden retriever, died aged 13 in late March 2011. In July 2013, Socks and Cookie made their final appearance in the studio in Salford, as (like Shelley the tortoise) they live in London, but they are still regarded as part of the programme team. Trained Guide Dog Iggy, who joined in 2014, still appears regularly. In 2019, new dog (Beagle-Basset Hound cross) Henry joined the team. They are attended by resident vet Dr Rory Cowlam.

Blue Peter Garden

Since the 1970s, presenters have maintained a Blue Peter Garden. The first garden, which was designed by British horticulturist Percy Thrower in 1974, was at the rear of Television Centre. Its features included an Italian sunken garden with a pond that contained goldfish, a vegetable patch, greenhouse and viewing platform. The garden was also used to commemorate the show's pets and notable events. A bust of the dog Petra was placed in the garden after her death in 1977. The remains of George the Tortoise were interred there in 2004. It had a sculptures of the Blue Peter ship, and a plaque honouring Percy Thrower, who died in 1988. The garden was often made available to other programmes for outside broadcasts such as the links between children's programmes during the summer months and for BBC Breakfasts weather forecasts.

On Monday 21 November 1983, Janet Ellis reported that over the weekend the garden had been vandalised. A rumour circulated in the early 1990s that the vandalism had been carried out by a gang that included the future English international footballers Dennis Wise and Les Ferdinand when they were teenagers. Both men denied any involvement, although Ferdinand did later appear to confess to "helping a few people over the wall." However, Ferdinand later recanted saying he had been making a joke and was never there.

In September 2011, when the programme's production base moved to Dock10 in Salford, parts of the first garden including the sculptures and the sunken pond, were relocated to the piazza outside the new studio. The 2000 Blue Peter time capsule that was buried in London was also brought to the new location. It was due to be opened in 2029 but was accidentally dug up in 2017. Blue Peters second garden was officially opened on Thursday 23 February 2012 by The Princess Royal. Like its predecessor, it continues to be used throughout the year for outdoor broadcasts and live events.

Main badges

Children (and adults) who appear on the show or achieve something notable may be awarded the coveted Blue Peter badge. The Blue Peter badge allows holders free entry into a number of visitor attractions across the UK. In March 2006, this privilege was temporarily suspended after a number of badges were discovered for sale on the auction site eBay. This suspension was lifted in June 2006, when a new "Blue Peter Badge Card" was introduced to combat the problem, which is issued to each badge winner to prove that they are the rightful owners.

The presenters almost always wear their badge; the only exception being when their apparel is incompatible (for example, a life jacket), in which case a sticker with the ship emblem is normally used instead. In addition, large prints or stickers of the ship are attached to vehicles driven by the presenters during filming assignments.

In addition to the standard "Blue" badge, several variations of the badge exist, for various achievements, including:
 Silver badges, for sending in a different creative contribution to the show when already having a Blue badge.
 Green badges, for contributions with a conservation, nature or environmental theme
 Gold badges, the most rarely awarded, for exceptional achievement, bravery or endeavour
 Orange badges, for competition winners and runners-up (replacing the previous circular "competition winner's badge")
 Fan Club badges, a purple badge awarded for completing a review of the show and providing suggestions for future segments
 50th anniversary badge, awarded for sending a picture, poem or letter on the subject of the programme's 50th birthday
 Factbyte factory badge, awarded to people who completed up to V.I.P. level 7 on the Factbyte factory online game on the official Blue Peter website in 2009
 Sport badge, awarded each summer, based on participation in sport or physical activity
 Diamond Badge''', awarded to people from February 2018 to February 2019 to celebrate Blue Peter's 60th anniversary

Annual events
The programme also marks annual events, including Chinese New Year, St David's Day, Shrove Tuesday, Mothering Sunday, Guy Fawkes Night and Christmas. The latter, in particular, is a special occasion with a traditional format repeated year on year.

Shrove Tuesday

Usually shows one of the presenters making a pancake. It is usually the newest presenter who makes the pancake and attempts to toss it perfectly.

Mothering Sunday

Usually shows the viewers how to make their own Mother's Day card or present.

Guy Fawkes Night

Usually tells the history of Guy Fawkes and the Gunpowder Plot whilst the presenters tell viewers about the firework code and tips for a safe bonfire and fireworks night.

Christmas

The traditional Christmas programme usually opens with the signature tune being replaced with a brass band arrangement of the carol "Good King Wenceslas" juxtaposed with shots of viewers' home-made Christmas cards and followed by the lighting of the final candle on the Advent Crown. The programme's Christmas manger figures are featured, reminding viewers of the Nativity story, a last-minute Christmas make, either a song and dance or filming assignment and the grand finale; the Chalk Farm Salvation Army Band and children from various schools, assisted by members of the BBC Symphony Chorus, marching "up the hill" and into the studio from the cold outside (lanterns in hand) singing a Christmas carol (alternating years between either "Hark the Herald Angels Sing" or "O! Come All Ye Faithful") around the Blue Peter Christmas tree. In some years there was a Christmas play, either spoofing hit movies like Grease, popular songs or a pantomime. Much of the script has been repeated year after year for this special programme. However, for the 2007 Christmas programme, none of these traditions were featured (although the crib had been glimpsed in the previous edition), ending a format repeated annually since the 1960s. Apart from presents for the presenters and pets and a brief look at the programme's Nativity crib, the traditional elements remained largely absent in 2008 and 2009. From 2010 the closing carol was reinstated, with the Chalk Farm Salvation Army Band being replaced by the Salford band from 2011 onwards, as the programme had moved to MediaCity by then. In 2014, the full traditional content was revived, including the viewers' home-made cards accompanied by the Good King Wenceslas arrangement, the Advent Crown (although now using electric candles for safety reasons) and (after an absence in the previous two years) the sparkling ship logo appearing by the shot of the crib in the studio at the end of the closing carol. The Good King Wenceslas sequence was discontinued in 2016, but the Nativity crib, Advent Crown and sparkling ship logo endured, although the last two did not feature in 2020. However in 2021, the Advent Crown returned.

Appeals

An enduring feature of the programme is the annual charity appeal, which asks viewers to collect items that can be recycled or sold to raise money for the chosen cause. For example, in 1973–74, Blue Peter sponsored a "Stampede", asking people to donate postage stamps in support of Ethiopian famine relief. This is always a charity project in the UK in odd-numbered years, and abroad in even-numbered. The appeal is usually launched in late November and runs through to February or March of the following year. Until 1979, only waste products were ever collected, such as stamps, linens, coins, scrap metal etc. In 1979, one of the most popular forms of raising appeal money was introduced, encouraging viewers to hold "Blue Peter Bring And Buy Sales" at which buyers are also encouraged to bring their own bric-a-brac or produce to sell. The Great Bring And Buy Sale was used every few years or so as a means of adding variety to the collecting theme during other years.

Between 2001 and 2003 a series of "Bring And Buy Appeals" led many viewers and the media to voice their concern that the traditional method of collecting scrap items to recycle was being abandoned in favour of the "easier revenue" generated by the sales. This led to an on-air explanation by presenter Konnie Huq during the 2003 Get Together Appeal that this particular appeal required the sort of funding that only Bring And Buy Sales could raise. The 2004 and 2005 appeals saw a return to the collecting theme: the first being to collect old clothes that Oxfam could sell in its stores to raise funds for a family-searching service in third world countries ravaged by war, and the second being the collection of old mobile telephones and coins that could be recycled to raise money for ChildLine. Continuing the return to collecting unwanted items, Blue Peter launched its Shoe Biz Appeal campaign in 2006. In partnership with UNICEF, its aim was to collect unwanted pairs of shoes or other footwear in order to raise money for children orphaned by AIDS and HIV in Malawi. The 2007 appeal was the "Disc Drive" – working with Barnardo's to sell unwanted CDs and DVDs.

During appeals, the sum of money or objects collected is presented on the totaliser – a display that lights to show the amount collected. With some appeals, a second totaliser has often been introduced immediately after the original target has been met, with the aim of providing an incentive to keep on donating.

The 2007 Disc Drive Appeal was, controversially, handled in a different editorial style, and it was not featured in each programme since its launch as in previous years. Also the totaliser, previously a part of the studio set, was relegated to an on-screen animation/graphic.

The 2008 appeal was called Mission Nutrition, an attempt to provide children in the UK, Bangladesh and South Africa with better food. As part of this appeal, the Blue Peter presenters held the world's biggest bring and buy sale on 18 February 2009, which was attended by several celebrities as well as regular people. Since the 2008 appeal there has been a return to regular features on the Appeal's progress in each edition, and the reinstatement of a physical studio set Totaliser.

The 2009 Appeal was "Send a Smile Appeal" which was symbolic as being the first Appeal in the history of the programme to blend a collecting theme with the Blue Peter "make" methodology. Children were encouraged to collect unwanted T-shirts to be donated to Operation Smile, a charity providing free reconstructive surgery to children in the developing world, where they were to be used as surgical gowns for their operations. Appeal contributors were encouraged to customise their gowns in a variety of creative ways, as well as following instructions given on the programme for how to include eyelets and ties to the backs of the gowns. In subsequent years, the traditional Appeal has been dropped in favour of general fundraising and awareness-raising for BBC Children in Need.

As part of the 50th year a BBC estimate was that since the first appeal started Blue Peter has raised over £100 million (inflation adjusted figure to 2008 value) by appeals.

In 2018, it was announced that to celebrate Blue Peters 60th year, it's 'Bring and Buy Sales' would be returning in aid of BBC Children in Need.

Book awardsBlue Peter promotes the Blue Peter Book Awards, a series of literary prizes for children's literature awarded annually, and inaugurated in 2000.

Time capsules
One of the most iconic parts of the show is its time capsules. Tradition began in 1971 when the first Blue Peter time capsule was buried, set to be opened in 2000 to show the next generations of viewers about life of the time, viewers selecting what goes in the time capsule. Since then more time capsules have been buried and opened.

1971–2000
The first time capsule was buried by Valerie Singleton, John Noakes and Peter Purves in front of the BBC Television Centre, where the presenters dug and buried the capsule. It contained objects from the time such as a copy of the 1970 Blue Peter annual, a set of decimal coins – which were introduced in 1971 – and photographs of the three presenters. The box had to be moved at one point in its long burial - the original site of the capsule was due to be developed in 1984 so the box was unearthed and moved to another site in the Blue Peter garden.

On Friday 7 January 2000, presenters Katy, Konnie, Simon and Matt were joined with Valerie, John and Peter, who buried the capsule, to help unearth it. The team used a treasure map to locate the box and then dug it up and opened it. Water had leaked into the box and partially damaged some items, however most of the items were in surprisingly good condition. Editor Richard Marson decided that the opening of the capsule should not be broadcast live as it was unclear as to what would be discovered inside or even if the rusted container could even be opened. He was glad he made this decision when it became clear during the recording that the capsule had at some point been opened - probably at the time it was moved and reburied - and that the contents had been wrapped entirely differently from the original burial. By editing the video of the opening, he managed to avoid this becoming obvious to the viewers.

1981–2022
A second box was buried in March 1981 by Simon Groome, Sarah Greene and Peter Duncan under a multi-storey carpark at BBC Television Centre. It featured ‘records of what life was like in the 1980s’, including projects and drawings from the children on food, fashion, and sport. It also featured records from Blue Peter at the time, including photos of the presenters and their ‘signature tunes’.

It had been discovered by builders at BBC Television Centre in 2022 and was opened up on This Morning in June 2022 by Sarah Greene, Phillip Schofield and Holly Willoughby.

1984–2000
A third box was buried alongside the original by presenters Simon Groom, Peter Duncan and Janet Ellis, when the original was moved to the Blue Peter garden. This box contained hairs from Goldie the Blue Peter Labrador, a record of the programme's theme tune arranged by Mike Oldfield and video footage of the moving of Petra's statue. The later capsule was dug up by Groom and Ellis.

1998–2017/2050 (The Millennium Time Capsule)
The fourth was buried by Katy Hill and Richard Bacon in the floor beneath the Millennium Dome on 11 June 1998. As well as containing Blue Peter items including a badge and history of the programme, the capsule also contains a set of Teletubby dolls, an insulin pen and a France '98 football. The time capsule was set to be opened in 2050, however in 2017 it was accidentally dug up by builders and damaged.

It was then taken back to Salford and restored successfully. In 2018 it was announced that, as part of the show’s 60th birthday, the contents would go on tour with various past presenters meeting it at several locations, after which it would be stored in the National Archives until 2050.

2000–2029
Following the unearthing of the first two time capsules in 2000 a fourth time capsule was to be buried in the Blue Peter garden. Alongside one of the recent Blue Peter books, two video tapes of the shows best bits from 1999, Photographs of the presenters and crew of the show in 2000 as well as items celebrating the shows 40th birthday in 1998. Matt Baker, Simon Thomas, Katy Hill & Konnie Huq also contributed by adding their own contribution. The capsule is due to be dug up in 2029.

2018–2038 (The Diamond Time Capsule)
In 2018, the team announced a new time capsule for their 60th anniversary. Viewers could suggest the contents of the time capsule through the website for the first time, and it is also to be stored in the National Archives, the first time it will not be buried. The capsule was stored on the 60th birthday programme by a competition winner, who had won the chance to have her design printed onto the capsule, as well as presenters Radzi Chinyanganya, Lindsey Russell, Valerie Singleton, Peter Purves, Janet Ellis and Katy Hill.

Books
In 1964, the first Blue Peter book was published by Lutterworth Press, by arrangement with the BBC. Due to the success of the book, the BBC produced an in house publication the following year. Although an annual in all but name, the books are rarely referred to as such. Each book (published in time for Christmas) features highlights from the previous twelve months of Blue Peter features, and chronicles major guests who visit the studio, the Summer expedition, the annual appeal, and the pets. The style of the books' contents has changed very little over the years, with the only noticeable difference between a 1960s book and the current formula being the increase in colour photography and digital artwork; otherwise, the principle is the same. There was, in 1986 and 1990, and between 1992 and 1997, a break in the publication of the books. Since Pedigree took over the books in 2004, there has been an increase in quality. The books are now bigger than before, with a greater number of pages. The Blue Peter editor and members of the production team write the book, and choose its content, though the book is written from the presenters' point of view. As for the 'book or annual' debate, as of Book 34 in 2004, the cover makes reference to it as "Annual XXXX" and the spine marking it as "Book XX". This is probably because The Beano and The Dandy books were renamed as annuals in 2003, leaving Blue Peter the only one still using the name book on its annuals.

A collectors' market has developed, with "Book One" being especially rare and commanding triple figures on online auction websites. Books from the late 1960s and 1970s are more common, and often turn up for less than a pound in second hand bookshops or charity stores. Books from the 1980s and 1990s tend to be more expensive and rarer, as people realised the value of keeping hold of them.

In the early 1970s a set of Blue Peter mini books were produced, covering specific topics that had been featured in the TV series. A set of these were buried in 1971 in the time capsule for the year 2000. The spin-off series Blue Peter Special Assignment also had books.

In 1973 a book about Paddington Bear's adventures with Blue Peter was published, called Paddington's Blue Peter Story Book.

In 2011 it was announced that, due to falling sales, the annuals would be scrapped."End of story for the Blue Peter Annual" , The Daily Telegraph, 23 September 2011. However, programme editor Tim Levell indicated that the book could return in the future.

Broadcast history
BBC One (1958–2012)Blue Peter first aired once a week on Mondays on the BBC Television Service, now BBC One, for a duration of 15 minutes. From 28 September 1964 until 1995 it was shown twice a week on Mondays and Thursdays, extending its duration to 25 minutes. A third show was added in 1995, broadcasting on Monday, Wednesday and Friday, and from 2000 the show began airing at 5pm, due to Newsround moving to a later slot.

From 2006 the show's output began to be reduced, first by dropping the Friday edition, and initially moving the programme schedule to Monday to Wednesday, before moving again to Tuesday to Thursday. In May 2007, it was announced the show would lose a show a week and return to broadcasting twice weekly, leaving Tuesday and Wednesday the only days on which Blue Peter was broadcast on BBC One. At the time the BBC claimed that the purpose of returning to two shows a week was to increase the quality of the programme's content rather than simply a means of reducing production costs.

The show's schedule was changed again in February 2008 when Blue Peter was moved to the 4.35 pm slot on BBC One, due to The Weakest Link moving from BBC Two to replace Neighbours which had transferred to Five. However, this timing change led to a decrease in viewing figures for the weekday afternoon CBBC One slot, with Blue Peter receiving fewer than 100,000 viewers, down from around 335,000 in 2003. The BBC Trust recommended that the BBC produce plans, detailing how they intended to increase viewership, by mid-2009.

In September 2010, the show was moved from Wednesdays and Tuesdays to Mondays and Tuesdays at the same time slot.

CBBC Channel (2012–)
From Thursday, 12 January 2012 another episode was dropped, with the show coming full circle by only broadcasting one new episode each week. For the first time in the show's history, first run episodes were now broadcast on the CBBC Channel, at 5.45pm on Thursdays. However, a repeat was still broadcast the following day on BBC One.

Eventually however, in December 2012, Blue Peter ended its 54-year run on BBC One and now airs only on the CBBC Channel. The move came as regular children's programming was removed entirely from BBC One and Two following the completion of the digital switchover. Viewing figures determined that 93% of CBBC's target audience was now watching the BBC's children's programming on the dedicated CBBC Channel (including first-run episodes of Blue Peter), and few viewers were watching solely on BBC One.

Repeats and spin-off showsBlue Peter was first repeated in full on satellite and cable channel UK Gold in the 1990s, one of the first archive channels in the UK. Later it moved to sister channel UK Gold Classics when UK Gold began broadcasting more recent programmes, although that channel lasted only six months before closing.

In September 1998, the BBC launched its first digital only channel BBC Choice. A few months after launch, a new weekend afternoon CBBC Choice strand began broadcasting, and as part of this a highlights show Re:Peter showcased the best of that week's Blue Peter shows. Re:Peter, along with a similar highlights show for Live & Kicking known as L&K Replay, ended when the strand was axed in April 2000 and became the daily 6am7pm CBBC on Choice programming block which launched in November 1999. However, in 2002, repeats of Blue Peter started being shown on CBBC on Choice's successor, the newly launched CBBC TV channel, along with spin-off shows Blue Peter Unleashed and Blue Peter Flies the World. From 2003 a new arrangement involved new material being shown daily, on both BBC One and the CBBC Channel.

In 2017, Blue Peter Bite, a five-minute programme which features challenges previously shown on the programme was introduced. However, this has since been renamed Blue Peter Challenges, and only includes challenges.
Summary

Signature tune and motif
The signature tune has always been a hornpipe, originally using variations of Barnacle Bill by Herbert Ashworth-Hope (not to be confused with the bawdy American drinking song Barnacle Bill the Sailor.) The original version of the theme was a recording by the New Century Orchestra issued by the FDH Mood Music library. From the 2008 series, the theme became a rendition of the similar Sailor's Hornpipe. However, from 14 October 2008, the tune has been a blend of both tunes.

Opening theme
The following is a list of all the versions of the Blue Peter signature tune that have been used on the show:

 Sidney Torch & The New Century Orchestra: October 1958 to January 1979
 Mike Oldfield: January 1979 to June 1989 (see "Blue Peter" (Mike Oldfield instrumental))
 Simon Brint: September 1989 to September 1992
 Simon Brint: September 1992 to September 1994
 The Yes/No People: September 1994 to August 1999
 David Arnold and the BBC Philharmonic Orchestra: September 1999 to June 2004
 Nial Brown: September 2004 to December 2006
Dave Cooke: January 2007 to June 2007
Dave Cooke &  The Blue Peter Music Makers: September 2007 to June 2008
Dobs Vye: September 2008 – June 2011
 Banks & Wag: September 2011 – May 2021
 Sanj Sen: June 2021 – present

The debut of a new version of the theme tune is sometimes accompanied with an introduction by the presenters at the time explaining the reasons behind the new rendition.

In 2006, a new version was arranged and recorded by Murray Gold as part of the Music Makers competition, with prize winners taking part in the final orchestral recording. Viewers were told that this recording would be used when the series returned from its summer break in September 2006; however, for unknown reasons this was not the case, save for excerpts being used as incidental music. Instead, when the September 2006 series began, a slightly shortened version of the 2004 arrangement was used, with Sailor's Hornpipe and the opening bars removed. Between January and June 2007, Dave Cooke (who was the husband of ex-presenter Tina Heath) re-arranged the theme tune, although it was confirmed that Murray Gold's new arrangement would be used from the new series in September 2007, to coincide with the programme's 50th anniversary celebrations. However, the version that ultimately aired bears little resemblance to either the original Murray Gold/Music Makers recording or any previous recording of the theme.

For the start of the September 2008 series, Barnacle Bill was dropped after nearly fifty years and replaced by an arrangement of the very similar Sailor's Hornpipe. On 14 October (the same week as the 50th anniversary) the opening tune was reworked to include elements of "Barnacle Bill" once again. The closing theme for 2008 was the same as the opening signature tune.

In September 2011, the series returned to using "Barnacle Bill" though with the opening bars and drum roll omitted and the traditional closing signature tune not used. On 16 October 2018 (the same week as the 60th anniversary), the opening tune was remixed like the 50th anniversary one, which is composed by David Roocroft.

A new version of the Blue Peter theme and opening titles was introduced in 2021.

 Closing theme 
There is little or no record of the closing music of Blue Peter in its earliest days, but by the mid-1960s, the show was closing with an edit of Parts Two and Three of Drums and Fife, from a 1961 suite of six library cues by Wilfred Burns, performed by The Light Symphonia, conducted by Roberto Capelli (Conroy, BM 301-A). This recording remained in use until January 1979 when it was replaced by an arrangement by Mike Oldfield.

The track continued to be rearranged along with subsequent versions of the opening theme until 1999, when Drums and Fife was dropped and the opening theme was instead used to close the show. Drums and Fife returned in an arrangement by Nial Brown used from 2004 to 2006, and then by Dave Cooke as of January 2007. From September 2007 to June 2008 the closing theme was slightly extended and rearranged, again by Dave Cooke. From 2008 Drums and Fife was dropped again with the closing theme being the same as opening signature tune.

Motif
The programme's motif is a stylised sailing ship designed by Tony Hart. Hart's original design was never successfully used in a totally uniform fashion, with several different reproductions used in studio, on badges, the Blue Peter books and on-screen graphics. This was until the show's redesign in 1999, when the ship's rigging and hull detail was removed, and in 2000, the flags were subtly reshaped. For the 2008 series there has been a return to the original flag design on the ship, although some of the mast detail on the bow and stern has been removed.

Opening titles
1958–1989:
The original opening titles showed a Blue Peter flag being lowered on a ship. By the late 1960s, the opening sequence featured extracts of that edition's filmed inserts or an event in the studio where speech was absent accompanied by the signature tune and superimposed presenter credits. The presenter's names were always listed in 'seniority' based on the order in which they joined the programme. From 1972 to 1975, any edition that featured Valerie Singleton, whether she was in the studio co-presenting the show, being seen in a filmed insert or even featuring in a repeated film item from the archives, her name was always above the other presenters.

1989–1997:
From 1989, a 2D animation of the Blue Peter ship had been developed and used alongside the 1985-introduced word-logo and was used as a method of displaying both the ship and Blue Peter name to precede any film or episode footage as before. From 1992 a 3D animation was used and further replaced by another graphical sequence in 1994. Once again, these animations preceded any film, studio or episode footage. Occasionally, from the 1994 series onwards, the 3D animation of the Blue Peter ship would be followed by a preview of certain items on the day's programme with a "coming up" caption and a presenter commentary. Again, the theme music would either play in full or fade out at an appropriate time.

1997–1999:
From 1997, a more generic title sequence was used with the 1994 ship and title animation remaining, but was followed by clips of different action shots from a variety of the past years' filming assignments intermixed with specially filmed "posing" footage of the presenters. The traditional format of episode-specific film or studio setting scenes were still used, occasionally on their own, or mixed into the generic footage to varying degrees depending on the day's edition. The theme music tended to play out in full, and on days when a totally generic version of the titles were used, the opening was often followed by a "coming up" sequence narrated by the presenters.

1999–2004:
By 1999, a new "bubble ship" symbol and titles sequence had been developed to be used alongside the traditional ship emblem. These bubble ships were seen floating around the presenters who were displayed in specially posed shots, and appeared to be floating above a graphical ocean on their own blue coloured ships, and in 2003 when the presenters' shots were updated, they appeared to be waving, smiling and blowing the bubble ships. This footage was also mixed in with episode-specific film, introductory studio setting or more predominantly from the 2003 series onwards a preview of many items on the day's programme with a return to a "coming up" caption and presenter commentary.

2004–2006:
In 2004, a similar approach was adopted with each presenter posing with "ship's rigging" in their hands, appearing as though they were hoisting the sails of the Blue Peter ship. This sequence, designed by BBC Broadcast (now Red Bee Media) saw a return to the sole use of the original Blue Peter ship logo and also featured the Blue Peter pets in their own poses. Predominantly these titles would precede a "coming up" sequence or occasionally clips of the edition's filming assignment. The original version used from 2004 to 2005 opened with the ship logo and featured silhouettes of unidentified children also hoisting sails along with the presenters. This was discarded in 2005 for the last year of the sequence's run and opened with the ship and Blue Peter name for the first time in six years – allowing more flexibility for when the titles would merge into that day's edition without being completed in full, as in the 1950–1990s era – before flowing into the rest of the titles (minus children) as before.

2006–2008:
From September 2006 a new title sequence was introduced, opening with the traditional Blue Peter ship logo, followed by the presenters surrounded by "fact file boxes" displaying statistics and information about them and also pictures of the pets and snippets of previous assignment films. This also marked the end of the traditional format of the presenter credits being credited in order of seniority (although this is likely to be down to the stylistic dictation of the titles in their "girl boy girl boy" arrangement – the only irregularity being Gethin Jones appearing before Zöe Salmon who debuted on the show five months before him). As in previous years, this new graphical sequence precedes a "coming up" sequence or, alternatively, footage of that edition's filming assignment. From September 2007 the posed portion of the same opening titles followed a "coming up" clip of that day's programme and used a new theme tune to accompany it.

Following Konnie Huq's departure in January 2008, the order of the opening sequence was rejigged slightly, with a filmed aerial pan of a cliff-face taken from a helicopter, featuring a lighthouse and large-scale impression of the Blue Peter ship on a grass lawn adjacent to it. The "chopper" sound of the helicopter's propellers imitates the traditional drum roll of the Blue Peter theme tune. The sequence then merges into a summary of what's coming up on the programme, with a quick cut at the end to the remaining three presenter poses, now having reverted to appearance order, i.e., Zöe > Gethin > Andy, before ending with the 2006–2008 logo board, minus Konnie's silhouette.

2008–2009:
This era of  Blue Peter titles see a return to the original format without posing presenters. Instead, a fast moving graphical approach is taken where the main colour is light blue. The logo board with the new look word logo appears at the end and graphically 'flows' away to reveal the day's programme. 2008 sees a new word mark for the first time since 1999 and some of the detail has been altered on the ship logo – for example, a return to the original flag design. Small changes have also featured in the studio where the mezzanine wall is now red, the big screen has a new frame and the seating has been re-jigged slightly.

2009–2011:
In the same style to the 2008 titles; however, the presenters' pictures and first names were now featured in the titles, following the 'coming up' section.

 2011–2013:
The new Blue Peter titles were created by Mighty Giant. The titles were meant to capture the essence of the show in 20 short seconds. The sequence Mighty Giant created had the presenters playing and throwing an object that changes throughout. As it transforms it captures another element of Blue Peter. These objects include for Helen, the Blue Peter adventure box, Technology screen and a ball. Barney's elements of Blue Peter in the titles include a globe, a piece of gaming technology and a keyboard. Mighty Giant shot the presenters against a green screen and then combined them with 3d objects back at its Northern Quarter base to create the desired effect. The logo also had a make over with the ship being put into a blue circle and the original designed ship in white inside the circle. The writing is the same as the 2008 logo.

2013–2015:
In 2013, the sequence had been replaced by a series of clips of previous programme activities.

2015–2021:
In 2015, the sequence had a colourful graphics with rainbow lines, as well as the letters of the logo and the Blue Peter ship logo were floating around in the titles. This sequence was designed by Liquid. It looked similar to the 1999–2004 and 2004–2006 ones.

2021–present:
A new sequence has introduced in 2021, which featured modern-day objects (e.g. a hand writing the message to the series), flying badges, and various clips of the series. Like the previous sequence, it is designed by Liquid.

General notes:  The opening titles of every programme featured the list of the presenters in order of their first appearance on Blue Peter, regardless of whether they actually appear in the edition in question (after 1995 and the introduction of the fourth presenter it was unusual to have all four presenters in the studio at the same time, save for special programmes). The only time this rule was not adopted is when the programme is a special pre-recorded assignment – for example a visit to a foreign country by two of the presenters, in which case the usual practice is just to credit the presenters appearing. Until 2004, the presenters were always credited by their full names. From September 2004, the opening titles only featured their first names, perhaps in a move to make the presenters appear more accessible to the audience. From September 2008, the titles went back to traditional style, not including presenters or their names. This however was changed again in 2009, when pictures of the presenters popped out from nowhere with their name by the side of them.

For the new Technology themed titles for September 2011, the presenters Helen and Barney appeared with specially shot sequences. The names however did not make a return. For the first time the presenters were interacting with different objects in the titles.

Closing credits
1958–1992: The Blue Peter closing credits were put on screen over the final moments of the programme to the sound of the closing theme tune. Alternatively, once the programme had officially ended (i.e., the presenters had said their "goodbyes") the camera would focus on shots of the pets or aspects of the studio as a calmer backdrop against which to flash up the credits. The sequence would always end with the Blue Peter ship filling the screen (originally a simple flat image, latterly a more graphically interesting incarnation) and BBC copyright blurb. Before 1989 the "Editor" credit (for almost all this period it was Biddy Baxter) would also flash up over the final moments of the programme, but since Lewis Bronze's promotion the editor credit was saved for the final ship frame, starting from 1987 until 1989, the sequence cuts to the frame of the Blue Peter ship that lights up.

1992–2003: Once again during this period the credits maintained the practice of appearing during the final seconds of the programme's presentation or once the script had finished. The major difference was that the text scrolled along the bottom third of the screen from right to left, usually overlaid on a graphical bar in the style of the opening titles. The exception to this rule was when the programme was on permanent Outside Broadcast for the whole show. During these occasions the same "theme" of credits would be used – i.e. the same graphics and background etc. but the typeface would almost always change to a completely different font and colour, regardless of the regular typeface used at the time. Also, the credits would flash up on screen one by one, as opposed to scrolling. It is unknown why these anomalies occurred, but it is likely to be related to the reduced technical abilities whilst transmitting a live O.B. The final frame of the credits was always the Blue Peter ship as displayed in the opening titles of the time and the editor's credit, along with BBC branding.

2004–2007: This period saw a sequence which showed flashed up credits along the bottom third of the screen, whilst a photo of a recent Blue Peter badge winner, with or without the project that won them their badge, was shown above. One of the presenters' voices was also heard introducing the winner and explaining what they did to win their badge. Occasionally on certain programmes, for example the launch of an appeal, special guests in the studio or when out on location, the credits ran as pre-2004 over the closing moments of the programme with the music fading in. Again, the credits end with the Blue Peter ship, editor and BBC credit.

2004, 2007–2008: Early in 2004, the producers experimented with flashing up the credits over a background of "on the next Blue Peter" type footage. This was discarded later in 2004 when the new arrangement of signature tune and titles were introduced and a revised format was adopted that remained in use until 2007. September 2007 saw a return to the "coming up next time" sequence of footage, with credits text overlaid on a graphical bar at the bottom section of the screen. The same ship and editor credit is used as the final frame.

2008–present: There are no closing crew credits; instead, the programme ends with a five-second caption of Blue Peter logo, the "bbc.co.uk/cbbc" caption border and the CBBC logo (and later, BBC Children's Productions Limited.)

General notes: The exceptions to the above were during the Christmas programme, when the credits still scrolled from right to left, often with Christmas-themed drawings separating each crew member. Until 2006, and again from 2010, the Christmas programme ends on a view of the children carol singers in the studio in the background, the Nativity scene in the foreground, studio lights dimmed, a star of Bethlehem glowing on the cyclorama and a sparkling silver Blue Peter ship overlaid on the screen (although the sparkling ship did not appear in the Christmas 2012 and 2013 editions).

When a "make" was featured in the programme, the creator of the item (invariably the retired Margaret Parnell or Gillian Shearing) was credited first (until credits were discontinued in 2008). An example of this would be "Dolls House make by Margaret Parnell".

Controversy

Presenters sacked
In October 1998, Richard Bacon became the first presenter to have his contract terminated mid-run, after he admitted to taking cocaine and punching a wall, following reports in a tabloid newspaper. Lorraine Heggessey, then the Head of BBC Children's programmes, apologised on air.

However, before Bacon, four previous presenters had left the programme when their contracts were not renewed, each for different reasons: these were Leila Williams in 1962, Christopher Wenner in 1980, Michael Sundin in 1985 and Romana D'Annunzio in 1998.

Fake phone competition winner
It was revealed by the BBC that a phone-in competition supporting the UNICEF "Shoe Biz Appeal", held on 27 November 2006, was rigged. The person who appeared to be calling in the competition was actually a Blue Peter Team Player who was visiting that day. The visitor pretended to be a caller from an outside line who had won the phone-in and the chance to select a prize. The competition was rigged due to a technical error when receiving the calls.

Former editor Biddy Baxter, described as still being influential with the programme today, explained the problem as an issue with a member of the production team on the studio floor and the Editor being oblivious to the situation in the studio gallery. She also went on to say that the programme would not feature premium rate telephone competitions in the future.

It was announced on 16 May 2007 that Blue Peter editor and unofficial historian, Richard Marson, had stood down from his job, although any link to the controversy of March 2007 remains in doubt.

In July 2007, Blue Peter was given a £50,000 fine by the Office of Communications (OFCOM) as a result of rigging the competition.

Political partiality
In August 2007 while the programme was off air for its annual Summer Expedition, long-time presenter Konnie Huq was involved in a press conference to promote the health benefits of cycling along with Mayor of London, Ken Livingstone. The Conservative Party accused the BBC of political bias as a result of one of its employees appearing at what was construed as a pro-Labour Party event. The BBC claimed to have turned down the offer for Huq to appear, but this was unknown to both her and her agent.

On 24 November 1988, Frank Ruse, a left-wing Labour councillor for Liverpool City Council, accompanied Liverpool's Pagoda Chinese Youth Orchestra to London for an appearance on Blue Peter. He was given a Blue Peter badge and wore it proudly to his council meetings. However, he received a BBC headed letter requesting the return of the badge. The letter (which was later discovered to be a forgery) stated that Blue Peter had been approached by the office of Neil Kinnock (Labour leader at the time) who were alarmed that a councillor with hard-left views had been given a Blue Peter badge. On receiving the Blue Peter badge from Frank Ruse, the BBC wrote back to him stating that they had sent no such letter (thereby proving it was a hoax) and an angry Ruse started a local and national enquiry to find out who sent the hoax letter.

"Socks"
In September 2007, an online vote on the BBC's Blue Peter official website took place to choose the name of the eighth Blue Peter kitten in January – the reported story was that, instead of calling the cat "Cookie" as chosen by a majority of the votes, the staff overruled the vote and called the kitten "Socks", citing problems with the voting system and a large surge in the former name. As a result of negative media coverage, the original cat, Socks, was joined by another kitten named Cookie, as had been chosen in the online vote. The BBC broadcast an apology on 25 September 2007 at the start of the new series.

Tributes, honours and awards
In a list of the 100 Greatest British Television Programmes drawn up by the British Film Institute in 2000, voted for by industry professionals, Blue Peter was placed 6th.

In 1992, Blue Peter won the BAFTA for Best Children's Programme (Factual): Lewis Bronze.

In 2008, Blue Peter was nominated for the BAFTA Children's Kids Vote Award.

Asteroid 16197 Bluepeter is named in its honour. The asteroid was discovered on 7 January 2000, the day that the Blue Peter time capsules from 1971 and 1984 were unearthed.

See also
 BBC
 CBBC (TV channel)
 Go With Noakes Duncan Dares Junior MagazineNotes

References

External links

50 Years of Blue Peter, National Science and Media Museum exhibition looking at 50 years of Blue Peter''

List of Blue Peter presenters on BBC website – no longer updated since September 2005

Blue Peter
1958 British television series debuts
1950s British children's television series
1960s British children's television series
1970s British children's television series
1980s British children's television series
1990s British children's television series
2000s British children's television series
2010s British children's television series
2020s British children's television series
CBBC shows
British children's education television series
BBC children's television shows
Television series by BBC Studios
English-language television shows
BAFTA winners (television series)